Michael Raymond Mainelli MStJ (born 1958), Chairman of Z/Yen, served as a Sheriff of the City of London from 2019–2021. He is an Emeritus Gresham Professor of Commerce at Gresham College,and founder of the Long Finance initiative. He has been Alderman for Broad Street Ward in the City of London since 2013, and was elected Aldermanic Sheriff on 24 June 2019.

Education
Mainelli attended Harvard College, Trinity College Dublin and the London School of Economics and Political Science.

Career
His early scientific research in aerospace and computer graphics led to him to start Swiss companies in seismology, cartography and energy information from 1979-84.  He produced a digital map of the world in 1983, Mundocart, and the $20 million Geodat cartography project from 1980-84. After joining Arthur Andersen in 1985, Mainelli became a senior partner and board member of the accountancy firm BDO Binder Hamlyn from 1987-94.

Mainelli lectured on new concepts of money and the role of government, publishing 28 one-hour lectures on commerce at Gresham College in the City of London while serving as Mercers' School Memorial Professor of Commerce from 2005 to 2009.  The theme of his programme was "Society’s Commercial Choice – Risks and Rewards of Markets".

In 2005 Mainelli, in conjunction with Gresham College, the City of London Corporation and financial institutions, launched Long Finance's London Accord, an agreement to share environmental, social and governance research with policy makers and the public.
While co-founding Z/Yen in 1994, Mainelli undertook merchant banking with Deutsche Morgan Grenfell and was Corporate Development Director of an R&D organisation, then the UK Ministry of Defence's Defence Evaluation and Research Agency, DERA (now largely Qinetiq and the Defence Science and Technology Laboratory) leading to two privatisations.  At Z/Yen, Mainelli established the Global Financial Centres Index, The London Accord, Long Finance, the Global Intellectual Property Index, the Global Green Finance Index, the Smart Centres Index, the Farsight Award, and other financial services initiatives.  His area of current research includes the Distributed Futures research programme and he speaks  on his research on 'smart ledgers' (aka blockchains) as well as other technologies.

Mainelli is a chartered certified accountant (FCCA), computer specialist (FBCS, CITP), securities professional (FCSI(Hons)) and management consultant (FIMC, CMC). He is a non-executive Director of the United Kingdom Accreditation Service (the UK's national body for standards and laboratories) where he is a proponent for competitive standards markets, and an AIM-listed company, Wishbone Gold plc. He is a Fellow and Trustee of Gresham College, Visiting Professor at UCL's Bartlett School, Honorary Fellow of King's College London, and a former visiting professor of the London School of Economics.

In 2013, Mainelli was elected Alderman of Broad Street ward for the City of London Corporation. In 2020, having been a trustee from 2008, he was made an Honorary Life Fellow of Gresham College. He has held advisory posts at City University, Hitachi UK, and HM Treasury. Michael is Past Master of the Worshipful Company of World Traders for 2017–18, and an honorary liveryman of the Furniture Makers, Water Conservators, Marketors, Tax Advisers, and International Bankers, an honorary freeman of the Educators, as well as a Craft-Owning Freeman of the Watermen & Lightermen.

Mainelli was elected Sheriff of the City of London on 24 June 2019 and assumed office on 27 September 2019. Due to the COVID-19 pandemic, he was asked by the electorate, and accepted, to extend his term till September 2021.

Awards and honours
 2003 UK Smart Award for prediction software, and was British Computer Society "Director of the Year" (2004–05).
 Member of the Order of St John (2019)

Writing
Mainelli has published around 50 journal articles, 200 commercial articles and four books, including the novel, "Clean Business Cuisine: Now and Z/Yen", written with Ian Harris. Mainelli's economics book, "The Price of Fish", also written with Ian Harris, applied his Gresham lecture series ideas to 'wicked problems'.  "The Price of Fish" won the 2012 Independent Publishers Gold Award for Finance, Investment and Economics.

Publications

Novels
 Michael Mainelli and Ian Harris, Clean Business Cuisine: Now and Z/Yen, Milet Publishing (2000), 160 pages.

Non-fiction
 Abdeldjellil Bouzidi and Michael Mainelli, L’Innovation Financière Au Service Du Climat: Les Obligations À Impact Environnemental, Revue Banque (2017), 123 pages.
 Michael Mainelli and Ian Harris, The Price of Fish: A New Approach to Wicked Economics and Better Decisions, Nicholas Brealey Publishing (2011), 328 pages [winner of the 2012 Independent Publisher Book Awards Finance, Investment & Economics Gold Prize].
 Ian Harris and Michael Mainelli, Information Technology for the Not-for-Profit Sector, ICSA Publishing (2001), 224 pages.

Personal life
Mainelli married in 1996 Elisabeth (née Reuß, 1964) and together they undertook the restoration of the Thames sailing barge Lady Daphne, while he still lectures on, and supports, sailing barges and their history. He has been an International Member, International Financial Services Industry Advisory Committee, Office of the Taoiseach – Dublin, Ireland since 2015.

Arms

References

External links
 www.cityoflondon.gov.uk
 www.liverycompanies.info
 www.world-traders.org
 

1958 births
21st-century English male writers
Alumni of Trinity College Dublin
Alumni of the London School of Economics
American economists
American people of Irish descent
British economists
English male non-fiction writers
English people of Italian descent
Harvard College alumni
Italian people of Irish descent
Living people
Professors of Gresham College